Chagin is a Russian masculine surname, its feminine counterpart is Chagina. Notable people with the surname include:

Nikolai Chagin (1823–1909), Russian architect
Vladimir Chagin (born 1970), Russian rally raid driver

Russian-language surnames